George Kipp may refer to:
 George Washington Kipp, member of the U.S. House of Representatives from Pennsylvania
 George Kipp III, member of the Montana House of Representatives